St Mary MacKillop College (formerly Blessed Mary MacKillop Colleges Albury) is an independent school, located in Jindera, New South Wales, Australia. The school was established in 2009 offering enrolments for Kindergarten to Year 12.

While the school is independent from the Roman Catholic Diocese of Wagga Wagga, it has a strong Catholic ethos with a religious education based on the Catechism of the Catholic Church and an emphasis on the lives of the saints as role models.

The school motto is Verum, Pulchrum et Bonum (Truth, Beauty and Goodness).

The school now has over 150 students ranging from Kindergarten to Year 12, with the 2019 HSC class holding eight students.

Through the entire school year holy and religious catholic events partake at the school ranging from Mass of the Saints in November to weekly Friday mass in the church "Help of Christians" next door.

See also
 List of non-government schools in New South Wales

References

External links
 Official website

Schools in Albury, New South Wales
Educational institutions established in 2009
Roman Catholic Diocese of Wagga Wagga
Catholic secondary schools in New South Wales
2009 establishments in Australia